The S5 district lies within in the City of Sheffield, South Yorkshire, England.  The district contains 18 listed buildings that are recorded in the National Heritage List for England.  Of these, one is listed at Grade II*, the middle grade, and the others are at Grade II, the lowest grade.  The district is in the north of the city of Sheffield, and includes the areas of Firth Park, Fir Vale, Longley, Parson Cross, Shirecliffe, Shiregreen, Southey Green and Wadsley Bridge.

For neighbouring areas, see listed buildings in S3, listed buildings in S4, listed buildings in S6, listed buildings in S9, listed buildings in S35 and listed buildings in Rotherham (Keppel Ward).



Key

Buildings

References 

 - A list of all the listed buildings within Sheffield City Council's boundary is available to download from this page.

Sources

 
Sheffield